Bulan Terbelah di Langit Amerika 2 ( or Split Moon in the American Sky 2) is an Indonesian drama film, directed by Rizal Mantovani. The film is a fourth sequel film from 99 Cahaya di Langit Eropa about a continuation of the adventures of Hanum and Rangga from Europe to United States. It stars Acha Septriasa, Abimana Aryasatya, Nino Fernandez, Rianti Cartwright, and Boy William.

Bulan Terbelah di Langit Amerika 2 was mainly filmed in San Francisco as well as Singkawang.

Plot
A husband and wife, Hanum and Rangga, are given tasks to find alleged treasures left by Chinese Muslim sailors in San Francisco.

Cast
 Abimana Aryasatya as Rangga
 Acha Septriasa as Hanum
 Nino Fernandez as Stefan
 Rianti Cartwright as Azima Hussein/Julia Collins
 Hannah Al-Rashid as Jasmine
 Boy William as Peter Cheng
 Hailey Franco as Sarah Collins
 Ira Wibowo as Hyacinth
 Yeslin Wang as Chinese Muslim of Hui ethnicity.
 Kenny Adianto Putra
 Eko Susilo as People's Liberation Army soldier
 Rudianto Fransiskus as People's Liberation Army soldier
 Novi Sari as audience of lion dance attraction (background actress)
 Astro Li as audience of lion dance attraction (background actor)
 Thomas Johansen as audience of lion dance attraction (background actor)

Soundtrack
Ost. Bulan Terbelah di Langit Amerika contains for two songs: "Bulan Terbelah Dilangit Amerika" by Ridho Rhoma and Nur Fazura and "Jangan Salahkan Cinta" by Andini and English band Arkarna.

See also
 Bulan Terbelah di Langit Amerika, the previous sequel film

References

External links 

 

2016 films
2010s Indonesian-language films
Indonesian drama films
Films based on Indonesian novels